Thor: Ragnarok (Original Motion Picture Soundtrack) is the film score to the Marvel Studios film Thor: Ragnarok composed by Mark Mothersbaugh. Hollywood Records released the album digitally on October 20, 2017, with a physical release on November 10, 2017.

Background
By August 2016, Mark Mothersbaugh was hired to score the film. Mothersbaugh was influenced by a video essay from the YouTube channel Every Frame a Painting, which criticized the scores from previous Marvel Cinematic Universe films for their lack of memorability, to make the score for Thor: Ragnarok as distinctive as possible. The score was recorded at Abbey Road Studios. The synthesized score is influenced by the work of Jean-Michel Jarre. Mothersbaugh combined synthesizer keyboards he used from his days with the band Devo with a 100 piece orchestra. Patrick Doyle's themes from Thor and Brian Tyler's themes from Thor: The Dark World and Avengers: Age of Ultron, as well as Joe Harnell's "The Lonely Man" theme from The Incredible Hulk series, are also used in the film. Director Taika Waititi would have asked the band Queen to work on the soundtrack for the film (if their lead singer Freddie Mercury was still alive) because the film is "a cool bold, colorful cosmic adventure" which would have suited the "feel" of the band. Hollywood Records released the film's soundtrack digitally on October 20, 2017, and was released physically on November 10, 2017.

Track listing
All music composed by Mark Mothersbaugh.

Additional music
Additional music featured in the film include "Immigrant Song" by Led Zeppelin and "Main Title" ("Golden Ticket"/"Pure Imagination") by Walter Scharf from the film Willy Wonka & the Chocolate Factory. "In the Face of Evil" by Magic Sword is featured in the official trailer.

References

2017 soundtrack albums
2010s film soundtrack albums
Marvel Cinematic Universe: Phase Three soundtracks
Thor (film series)